Noboribetsu may refer to:

Noboribetsu, Hokkaido
Noboribetsu Station